The 2002 NCAA Division I softball season, play of college softball in the United States organized by the National Collegiate Athletic Association (NCAA) at the Division I level, began in February 2002.  The season progressed through the regular season, many conference tournaments and championship series, and concluded with the 2002 NCAA Division I softball tournament and 2002 Women's College World Series.  The Women's College World Series, consisting of the eight remaining teams in the NCAA Tournament and held in held in Oklahoma City at ASA Hall of Fame Stadium, ended on May 27, 2002.

Conference standings

Women's College World Series
The 2002 NCAA Women's College World Series took place from May 23 to May 27, 2002 in Oklahoma City.

Season leaders
Batting
Batting average: .528 – Stacey Nuveman, UCLA Bruins
RBIs: 75 – Jaime Clark, Washington Huskies
Home runs: 21 – Leneah Manuma, Arizona Wildcats

Pitching
Wins: 36-7 & 36-8 – Nicole Myers, Florida Atlantic Owls & Cat Osterman, Texas Longhorns
ERA: 0.44 (22 ER/351.2 IP) – Jamie Southern, Fresno State Bulldogs
Strikeouts: 554 – Cat Osterman, Texas Longhorns

Records
NCAA Division I season walks:
108 – Veronica Nelson, California Golden Bears

NCAA Division I single game home runs:
4 – Jill Iacono, Saint Francis Red Flash; April 5, 2002

Sophomore class stolen bases:
73 – Nicole Barber, Georgia Bulldogs

Junior class doubles:
28 – Barbara Moody, Pacific Tigers

Senior class saves:
14 – Kellie Wilkerson, Mississippi State Bulldogs

Team season of stolen bases:
101-101 – DePaul Blue Demons

Awards
USA Softball Collegiate Player of the Year:
Stacey Nuveman, UCLA Bruins

Honda Sports Award Softball:
Jennie Finch, Arizona Wildcats

All America Teams
The following players were members of the All-American Teams.

First Team

Second Team

Third Team

References